Los pájaros (The Birds) is the third studio album by the pop rock artist Vicentico. It was released in 2006 through BMG.

Track listing 
All tracks by Vicentico except where noted.

 "El Arbol de la Plaza" (The Tree of The Square) – 4:26
 "El Baile" (The Dance) – 4:00
 "Ayer" (Yesterday) – 3:50
 "Si Me Dejan" (If They Let Me) – 3:58
 "Felicidad" (Happiness) – 4:01
 "La Deuda" (The Debt) – 3:58
 "Desapareció" (It Disappeared) – 4:43
 "Las Hojas" (The Leafs) – 3:58
 "El Fantasma" (The Ghost) – 2:46
 "Las Manos" (The Hands) – 4:22

Personnel 
 Vicentico – vocals

External links 
 www.vicentico.com
 Los pájaros at MusicBrainz
 [ Los pájaros] at Allmusic

Vicentico albums
2007 albums